Tambja brasiliensis is a species of colourful sea slug, a dorid nudibranch, a marine gastropod mollusc in the family Polyceridae.

Distribution
This species was described from south-eastern and southern Brazil.

References

Polyceridae
Gastropods described in 2014